Talhah or Talha is an Arabic masculine given name, meaning "fruitful tree from heaven". Talha is the name of a well-known sahabi (companion) of the Islamic prophet Muhammad, Talha ibn Obaidullah. He is renowned for saving Muhammad's face from an arrow by holding his hand in the way.

People with this name
 Notable people with this name
 Talhah, (died 656) famous companion of Muhammad.
 Talha ibn Hasan, son of Al-Hasan and his wife Umm Ishaq.
 Talha ibn Abd Allah al-Khuza'i, (died 684–685) Umayyad military commander.
 Talha ibn Jaʽfar al-Mutawakkil, (29 November 843 – 2 June 891) was the son of Abbasid caliph Al-Mutawakkil.
 Talha Jubair, Bangladeshi cricketer.
 Talha, a Malaysian actor
 Talhah Yunus, Pakistani songwriter, rapper, filmmaker and musician.
 Talha Anjum, Pakistani songwriter, rapper and musician.
 Talha Mosque 11th-century mosque in Yemen.

See also
Arabic name
 Talha ibn Ubaydullah

References

Arabic masculine given names